Macrostomus flavus is a species of dance flies, in the fly family Empididae.

References

Macrostomus
Insects described in 2009
Diptera of South America